The Diocese of Oxford is a Church of England diocese that forms part of the Province of Canterbury. The diocese is led by the Bishop of Oxford (currently Steven Croft), and the bishop's seat is at Christ Church Cathedral, Oxford. It contains more church buildings than any other diocese and has more paid clergy than any other except London.

The diocese now covers the counties of Berkshire (118 churches), Buckinghamshire (152 churches), Oxfordshire (227 churches) and five churches in the nearby counties.

History
The Diocese of Oxford was created by letters patent from Henry VIII on 1 September 1542, out of part of the Diocese of Lincoln. Osney Abbey was designated the original cathedral, but in 1545 this was changed to St Frideswide's Priory which became Christ Church Cathedral.

In 1836 the Archdeaconry of Berkshire was transferred from the Diocese of Salisbury to Oxford. This comprises the county of Berkshire and parts of Wiltshire.

By an Act of 1837 Buckinghamshire was notified of its transfer from the then Diocese of Lincoln, to become the Archdeaconry of Buckingham, effective from 1845.

In 2013 and 2014, the Diocese of Oxford discussed and resolved to undertake some pastoral alterations; the new archdeaconry of Dorchester was created on 1 March 2014. On 3 March 2014, it was announced that Judy French would become the first Archdeacon of Dorchester from June 2014.

Bishops
The diocesan Bishop of Oxford is assisted by the area bishops of Dorchester, Buckingham, and Reading. The suffragan See of Buckingham was created in 1914, and was the suffragan bishopric for the whole diocese until 1939 when the See of Dorchester was created; the See of Reading was re-created in 1942, after having been 'in abeyance' since 1909.

The provincial episcopal visitor (for Anglo-Catholic parishes in the diocese – among twelve other dioceses in the western part of the Province of Canterbury – which do not accept the ordination of women as priests) is the Bishop of Oswestry, who is licensed as an honorary assistant bishop of the diocese in order to facilitate his ministry in the diocese. Conservative evangelicals who reject the ordination and/or leadership of women due to complementarian beliefs, receive alternative episcopal oversight from the Bishop of Ebbsfleet.

Several retired bishops resident in or near the diocese are licensed to serve as honorary assistant bishops.:

Since 2001: Bill Down, retired Assistant Bishop of Leicester and Bishop of Bermuda, lives in Witney.
Since 2004: James Johnson (Bishop of St Helena) returned to parish ministry in Northants and Essex before retiring to Bodicote.
Since 2010: Anthony Russell, former Bishop of Ely and area Bishop of Dorchester, lives in Holton.
Since 2010: Henry Scriven, Mission Director for Latin America (CMS) and former Assistant Bishop in Pittsburgh and Suffragan Bishop in Europe, lives in Abingdon-on-Thames and is also licensed in Chichester and Winchester dioceses.
Since 2013: David Jennings, retired former Bishop suffragan of Warrington, lives in Northleach, Gloucestershire and is also licensed in Gloucester diocese.
Since 2013: John Went, former Bishop suffragan of Tewkesbury, lives in Latimer.

George Carey (retired Archbishop of Canterbury) lives in the diocese and was an honorary assistant bishop, but resigned his licence following his implication in the Peter Ball abuse case, and Humphrey Southern, former Bishop suffragan of Repton, is the Principal of Ripon College Cuddesdon.

Current extent

Counties
The diocese now covers the counties of
Berkshire (118 churches)
Buckinghamshire (152 churches)
Oxfordshire (227 churches)
and has
three churches in the county of Bedfordshire
one church in the traditional county of Middlesex
one church in the county of Hampshire

Episcopal areas
Since the creation of an area scheme in 1984, the diocese has been divided into three episcopal areas. The Bishop of Oxford has authority throughout the diocese, but also has primary responsibility for the city and suburbs of Oxford, which form the Archdeaconry of Oxford.

City of Oxford and surrounding area (Archdeaconry of Oxford)
current Bishop of Oxford: Steven Croft
includes Deaneries of Oxford and Cowley
Dorchester Episcopal Area (Archdeaconry of Dorchester)
current area Bishop of Dorchester: Colin Fletcher
includes Deaneries of Aston & Cuddesdon, Bicester & Islip, Chipping Norton, Deddington, Henley, Witney and Woodstock
Buckingham Episcopal Area (Archdeaconry of Buckingham)
current area Bishop of Buckingham: Alan Wilson
includes Deaneries of Amersham, Aylesbury, Buckingham, Burnham & Slough, Claydon, Milton Keynes, Mursley, Newport, Wendover and Wycombe
Reading Episcopal Area (Archdeaconry of Berkshire)
current area Bishop of Reading: Olivia Graham
includes Deaneries of Abingdon, Bracknell, Bradfield, Maidenhead & Windsor, Newbury, Reading, Sonning, Vale of White Horse, Wallingford and Wantage

Archdeaconries and deaneries 

*including Cathedral

Churches

Outside deanery structures

Deanery of Oxford 

1situated within the area covered by the Cowley deanery

Deanery of Cowley

Deanery of Abingdon 

Deanery website

Deanery of Aston and Cuddesdon

Deanery of Bicester and Islip

Deanery of Chipping Norton

Deanery of Deddington

Deanery of Henley

Deanery of Vale of White Horse

Deanery of Wallingford

Deanery of Wantage 

Deanery website

Deanery of Witney

Deanery of Woodstock

Deanery of Amersham 

Deanery website

Deanery of Aylesbury

Deanery of Buckingham 

Deanery website

Deanery of Burnham and Slough

Deanery of Claydon

Deanery of Milton Keynes

Deanery of Mursley

Deanery of Newport

Deanery of Wendover

Deanery of Wycombe 

Deanery website

Deanery of Bracknell

Deanery of Bradfield

Deanery of Maidenhead and Windsor

Deanery of Newbury

Deanery of Reading 

Deanery website

Deanery of Sonning

Other foundations employing Church of England clergy within the diocesan area

See also
Oliver Almond
Oxford Diocesan Guild of Church Bell Ringers

References

Church of England Statistics 2002

External links

Churches in the Diocese of Oxford ("A Church Near You")

 
Oxford
1541 establishments in England
Religious organizations established in the 1540s
Dioceses established in the 16th century